Jerangau is a mukim in Dungun District, Terengganu, Malaysia.

References

Dungun District
Mukims of Terengganu